Gian Christian is an Australian born producer. 

Christian produced the Australian premier production of the Broadway musical The Addams Family which was nominated for a Helpmann Award.

References

Living people
Year of birth missing (living people)